The Hazen Bridge, also known as the Newcomb Bridge, is a steel bridge spanning the Sangamon River north of Mahomet in Champaign County, Illinois, in the United States. It was constructed at a location known as White's ford, a popular crossing location of that era because of its proximity to Mahomet and Shiloh Church. The bridge was built in 1893 by Seevers Manufacturing Company of Oskaloosa, Iowa for the bid of $4,985. The name is derived from the Hazen family which owned property adjacent to the crossing. It was added to the National Register of Historic Places in 1994 as structure #94000433.

External links 

Illinois Historic Preservation Agency listing – Property number 201097
National Register nomination

Bridges completed in 1893
Transportation buildings and structures in Champaign County, Illinois
Road bridges on the National Register of Historic Places in Illinois
Former road bridges in the United States
Historic American Engineering Record in Illinois
Pedestrian bridges in Illinois
Truss bridges in the United States
National Register of Historic Places in Champaign County, Illinois
Steel bridges in the United States